Moze is an Italian surname derived from the Latin word Mosè (Moses). The earliest records of the name trace its appearance back to the region of Tuscany, in Pisa. It is also a nickname. It may refer to:

 Francis Moze (born 1946), French bass player
 Samrat Moze (born 1981), Indian politician
 Jennifer "Moze" Mosely, a character in the American television series Ned's Declassified School Survival Guide
 Moses "Moze" Pray, the male lead character of the film Paper Moon, played by Ryan O'Neal

See also
 Mose (disambiguation)

Italian-language surnames